The 1960 Chinese Mount Everest expedition was the first to successfully ascend Mount Everest via the North Ridge. Three members of the Chinese Everest Expedition Team, Wang Fuzhou, Gonpo, and Qu Yinhua reached the summit at 4:20 a.m., 25 May.

Preparation
In 1955, four athletes, led by Xu Jing, went to Soviet Transcaucasia to study mountaineering with an invitation from the Soviet Union. In 1957, six mountaineers, including Shi Zhanchun and Liu Lianman, summited Minya Konka, setting a domestic mountaineering record. The same year, the Soviet Union suggested to the Chinese Government that a Sino-Soviet joint climbing team should be formed for Mount Everest. The expedition was originally set for May 1959, but had to be postponed to 1960 due to the 1959 unrest in Tibet. Meanwhile, a 380 km-long road was built from Shigatse to Everest Base Camp, and a weather station was established. By 1960, however, Sino-Soviet split made a joint expedition impossible, and the Soviet Union team retracted all their equipment. The Chinese Government allocated 700,000 US dollars of foreign exchange to purchase mountaineering equipment from Switzerland. The total cost was comparable to that of the 1st National Games of China.

At this time, summiting Mount Everest was designated as a "national task" for the upcoming China-Nepal border negotiations, as the status of Mount Everest was still disputed. In February 1960, the Chinese Everest Team, with 214 members, was formed. Han Fudong, leader of the "hero regiment" from Chinese Civil War Battle of Tashan, was appointed as director. Shi Zhanchun and Xu Jing was team leader and deputy leader, respectively. The team also included geomorphologist Wang Ming Ye.

Acclimatization expeditions
On 3 March 1960, the team of 192 members arrived at Everest Base Camp. They moved several tonnes of equipment to the Camp and set up Camp 1-3 at the base of East Rongbuk Glacier (5400 m), central part of the glacier (5900 m), and under the North Col (6400 m), respectively.

On 19 March, the main members of the climbing team arrived at the Base Camp. On 25 March, the first acclimatization expedition was launched. The team moved equipment to Camp 3 and found a route pass the North Col. In the second expedition of 6 April, 4th Camp at 7007 m was set up. On 29 April, a third acclimatization expedition with the task of setting an Advance Camp at 8500 m was launched. The team encountered strong winds and only arrived at 7600 m in the next evening. In the evening of 2 May, Shi Zhanchun, Xu Jing, members Lhakpa Tsering and Migmar set off to chart a route and ascended to 8100 m. However, the transport team failed to catch up. The two Tibetan members returned to 7600 m, and Lhakpa Tsering climbed back to 8100 m with three transport team members, including Gonpo. While Lhakpa Tsering left to set a camp at 8100 m, Shi Zhanchun continued to climb the Second Step, and selected a route to the summit.

After the third expedition, more than 50 team members, including Shi Zhanchun, suffered from frostbite and had to quit. In Beijing, Marshal He Long was following the team's progress and instructed the team to summit despite all costs. On 17 May, the final expedition was launched. In the afternoon, 23 May, Xu Jing, Wang Fuzhou, Liu Lianman and Gonpo set up the Advance Camp at 8500 m. Qu Yinhua and the transport team also arrived at the camp.

Final expedition
The 4-member-team set off at 9 a.m., 24 May. Soon, Xu Jing was exhausted and had to be replaced by Qu Yinhua. At 12 p.m., they arrived at the Second Step. After several unsuccessful attempts to climb over the Step's last section, Liu Lianman, who was previously a fireman, suggested a "human ladder". Qu Yinhua removed his mountaineering shoes, and stood on Liu Lianman's shoulder to fix ice picks and safety ropes. They climbed over the Second Step at 5 p.m. With Liu Lianman remaining at a cave under the cliff, Wang Fuzhou led the other team members to continue ascending. Their oxygen was used up at 8800 m. At 4:20 a.m., 25 May, they arrived at the summit. The three members remained at the summit for 15 minutes, and left a 20 cm tall statue of Mao Zedong, a national flag, and a paper note.

The team retreated to 8500 m at 9 p.m., and then to 6400 m on 28 May. By 30 May, all members had retreated to the Base Camp. The celebration ceremony was held at the Base Camp on 1 June. Qu Yinhua lost all 10 toes and right index finger to frostbite.

Reaction
The expedition left no photographic evidence at the summit, and was originally met with skepticism in the West. Some in the international mountaineering community have acknowledged the result as more evidence has been revealed, however there remains no consensus opinion.  
Some members of the international mountaineering community, including some individuals whom have experience submitting Everest personally, continue to express doubts about the whether the evidence contained within the 1960 Chinese team's expedition report is sufficient to definitively prove that they successfully reached the mountain's true summit.

The expedition had no photographic evidence at summit as the team ascended at night. Additionally, the plaster statue of Mao Zedong was gone by the time of the 1963 American expedition. Therefore, the news was originally met with suspicion in the West. However, evidence has persuaded many international mountaineers that the team indeed reached the summit. Most notably, features recorded in the 1960 expedition report, including details of the Third Step and terrain near the summit, matched with later summit attempts from the north side. Climbing without oxygen, which was previously regarded as impossible, is also increasingly common.

References

Mount Everest expeditions
1960 in China
Mountaineering in China
1960 in Tibet